A cape is a sleeveless outer garment, which drapes the wearer's back and fastens at the neck.

Cape, the Cape, or CAPE may also refer to:

Places
Cape (geography), a headland or a promontory of large size extending into a body of water
Cape Ann, Antarctica
Cape Ann, Massachusetts, United States
Cape Canaveral, Florida, United States
Cape Canaveral Space Force Station, an launch station of the United States Space Force
Cape Cod, Massachusetts, United States
Cape Comorin, India
Cape Horn, Chile
Cape May (Antarctica), McMurdo Sound, Antarctica
Cape May, New Jersey, United States
Cape of Good Hope, a headland on the southwest coast of South Africa, when referred to as the Cape, a metonym for:
Dutch Cape Colony, a colony of the Dutch East India company
Cape Colony, a British colony in South Africa that replaced the Dutch Cape Colony
Cape Province, a former province of South Africa formed from the Cape Colony 
Cape Town, a city in South Africa, and surrounding areas

People
 Cape (surname)

Arts, entertainment, and media
 The Cape (1996 TV series)
 The Cape (2011 TV series)
 "The Cape", a short story and comic book series by Joe Hill (writer)

Brands and enterprises
 Cape (software company), an American developer of drone software
 Cape Air, an American airline
 Cape plc, a British energy services company, founded as Cape Asbestos Company
 Jonathan Cape, a former London publishing firm that is now one of Random House's British imprints

Acronym
 Caffeic acid phenethyl ester, a derivative of caffeic acid 
 Canadian Association of Physicians for the Environment 
 Career and Professional Education, a type of school academy in Florida
 Caribbean Advanced Proficiency Examination, an advanced level exams taken in CARICOM countries
 Center for the Army Profession and Ethic, a U.S. Army organization dealing with ethical training
 Coalition of Asian Pacifics in Entertainment, an advocacy organization in the United States
 Community Action for Preventing Extremism, anti-far-right extremism program in New South Wales, Australia
 Computer-aided production engineering, a relatively new and significant branch of engineering
 Convective available potential energy, an indicator of atmospheric instability used in meteorology
 Cyclically adjusted price-to-earnings ratio, a stock market valuation measure
 Director of Cost Assessment and Program Evaluation, an office within the Office of the Secretary of Defense at the Pentagon

Other uses
 Cape (dog), an identifying item worn by a working dog
 Cape (writ), old legal writ related to a plea of lands and tenements
 Cape class (disambiguation), various ship classes
 Cape Party (or CAPE), a small South African political party

See also 
 Cape Horn (disambiguation)
 Cape Island (disambiguation)
 CAPES (disambiguation)
 Cope (disambiguation)